Songs For The Sad Eyed Girl is the fifth album by London indie pop band Biff Bang Pow! released in 1990.<ref name="Discogs.com">[http://www.discogs.com/Biff-Bang-Pow-Songs-For-The-Sad-Eyed-Girl/release/1020447 Biff Bang Pow! on Discogs.com]</ref>

Track listing
Side AShe Kills Me - (04:42)The Girl From Well Lane - (02:39)Baby, You Just Don't Care - (04:19)If You Don't Love Me Now You Never Ever Will - (02:43)
Side BSomeone To Share My Life With - (02:49)Religious - (05:34)Hug Me Honey'' - (02:54)

Personnel
Richard Green - electric guitar
Edward Ball - organ, piano, voice
Ken Popple - percussion, voice
Joss Cope - synthesizer
Alan McGee - voice, acoustic guitar

References

1990 albums
Biff Bang Pow! albums